Teri Payal Mere Geet is a Hindi movie produced by Prem Lalwani, starring Govinda and Meenakshi Sheshadri. The movie was directed by Rehman Naushad and was released in 1993.

Story
It's a love story about Premee (Govinda) and Laila Jaan (Meenakshi Sheshadri). Premi loves Laila Jaan and one day he finds out that she works at a brothel. Later Premi finds out that Laila Jaan was an ordinary dancer and he tries to win her back. He kisses her and she slaps him. He then abducts her and they fall in love.

Cast
Govinda as Premee
Meenakshi Sheshadri as Laila Jaan / Leela
Shakti Kapoor as Benni
Kadar Khan as Jhanjhotia
Johnny Lever as Dubey 
Bharat Bhushan as Ustad Khan
Navin Nischol as Thakur

Soundtrack
Movie featured 8 songs. Music was by Naushad and lyrics by Hasan Kamal.

References

1990s Hindi-language films

External Links